Stephen Malkmus is the debut album by Stephen Malkmus, released on February 13, 2001 by Matador Records. Malkmus had planned to create the record by himself, or through a smaller, local label, but eventually accepted the offer Matador made, and he released it. Pre-release promotional CDs of the album exist under the working titles Jicks and Swedish Reggae. Malkmus intended to release the album as The Jicks, but Matador insisted that the album be released under his own name. The album peaked at number 124 in the US and number 49 in the UK.

Critical reception 

Stephen Malkmus received positive reviews from music critics. Rob Sheffield, writing for Rolling Stone, compared the album favorably to the solo debuts by Television's Tom Verlaine and The Velvet Underground's Lou Reed, commenting: "Freed from the constraints of a band that didn't constrain him all that much, [Malkmus] grapples with the problem of what to do with all the empty spaces in the music". Similarly, Pitchfork reviewer Nick Mirov opined that Malkmus "has regained his songwriting stride, and he sounds more confident than he's been in a long time". The album appeared at number 28 in The Village Voices Pazz & Jop critics' poll for 2001.

Track listing

Personnel 
Stephen Malkmus – vocals, guitar, keyboards, synthesizer, bass
John Moen – drums, percussion, background vocals
Heather Larimer – percussion, background vocals
Joanna Bolme – piano, synthesizer, bass, claves, background vocals

Charts

References

External links 

2001 albums
Matador Records albums
Stephen Malkmus albums